Journey to the West II is a Hong Kong television series adapted from the 16th-century novel Journey to the West. The series was produced by TVB and was first broadcast on TVB Jade in Hong Kong from October to December 1998. It is a sequel to the 1996 television series Journey to the West, also produced by TVB, which covered only the first half of the novel. Benny Chan takes over the role of the Monkey King from Dicky Cheung in Journey to the West II, while the other principal cast members Kwong Wah, Wayne Lai and Evergreen Mak reprise their roles from the previous series.

Cast

Main cast
 Benny Chan as Sun Wukong
 Kwong Wah as Tang Sanzang
 Wayne Lai as Zhu Bajie
 Evergreen Mak as Sha Wujing
 Tong Chun-ming as White Dragon Horse

Other cast
 Note: Some cast members played multiple roles.

 Rebecca Chan as Princess Iron Fan
 Gordon Liu as Bull Demon King, Golden Horned King
 Chillie Poon as Mantangjiao
 Derek Kok as Long Armed Ape Monkey
 Kingdom Yuen as Crow Demon
 Joyce Chan as Little Cloud Sparrow, Xiaocui
 Angie Cheung as Python Demon (formerly the Sparrow Fairy until she's cursed by another Python Demon)
 Danny Summer as Yellow Brows Great King
 Joyce Koi as Guanyin
 Chor Yuen as Buddha
 Wong Wai-leung as Siddhartha (the Buddha before he attained nirvana)
 Lau Dan as Venerable Zhihui
 Wong Wai as Subhuti
 Paul Chun as Maitreya, Elephant Demon
 Lee Lung-kei as Jade Emperor
 Leung Bo-jing as Queen Mother of the West
 Louisa So as Eldest Fairy Xueliang, Queen
 Joe Ma as Erlang Shen
 Ken Lok as Celestial Hound
 Cheung Ying-choi as Taibai Jinxing
 Melissa Ng as Nüwa
 Wah Chung-nam as Taishang Laojun
 Suen Kwai-hing as Nanji Xianweng, Constable
 Yu Tze-ming as Day Duty Star, Turtle Chancellor
 Kwok Tak-shun as Old Man under the Moon, Master Cheng
 Cindy Au as Shancai (Red Boy)
 Lo Mang as Li Jing
 Mimi Lo as Nezha
 Wong Tin-dok as Earth Deity
 Chan Chung-kin as Manjusri
 Ron Ng as Mahākāśyapa
 Yau Biu as Duke of Thunder
 Suen Yan-ming, Doi Siu-man, Siu Cheuk-yiu, Kon Tze-cheng as Four Heavenly Kings
 Fung Sui-jan as Granny of Wind
 Lily Liew as Woman of Clouds
 Au Kar-wai as Deity of Thunder
 Chan Wing-chun as Lü Dongbin, Immortal Zhenyuan
 Wong Wai-tak as Han Xiangzi, Crown prince of Wuji
 Wong Fung-king as He Xiangu
 Mak Ka-lun as Lan Caihe
 Leung Kin-ping as Royal Uncle Cao
 Koo Ming-wah as Zhongli Quan
 Wong Wai-lam as Iron Crutch Li
 Lee Hoi-sang as Elder Zhang Guo
 Sherming Yiu as Chang'e, Princess Wencheng
 Ng Man-sang as An Jing Si
 Lee Chi-wah as Ning Shen Si
 Tong Chun-sang as Mingyue
 Elton Loo as Cowherd
 Lo Cheuk-nam as Juling Shen
 Lau Kong as Old Dragon King
 Lily Li as Dragon Queen
 Law Lok-lam as Dragon King of the East Sea, Chen Guangrui (King of Wuji)
 May Kwong as Princess Pearl
 Akina Hong as Oyster Spirit, Meticulous Devil
 Yu Mo-lin as Turtle Chancellor's wife, Fish Demon
 Yip Chun-sing as Shrimp General
 Cheng Ka-sang as King Yama
 Tang Yu-chiu as Hell Judge
 Cheung Chung-ji as Hell guard
 Poon Chi-man as Emperor Taizong of Tang
 Choi Kwok-hing as Wei Zheng
 Wong Man-biu as Yuchi Gong
 Mak Tze-wun as Fang Xuanling
 Chiu Shek-man as Xu Shiji
 Yu Tin-wai as Du Ruhui
 Chun Hung as Cheng Yaojin, Silver Horned King, Beggar
 Cheung Hung-cheung as Li Jiancheng
 Leung Kin-ping as Li Yuanji
 Joey Leung as Black Bear Demon
 Mariane Chan as White Bone Demon
 Rain Lau as Spider Demon (En'en)
 Law Lan as Spider Demon (En'en's mother) / Golden and Silver Horned Kings' mother
 Lee Wai-kei as Lion Demon
 Lam Chun-leung as Six Eared Macaque
 Andy Tai as King of Spiritual Touch
 Irene Wong as Little Peng Girl
 Kenny Wong as Dream Demon
 Kwan Ching as King of Rakshasa, Rhinoceros Demon
 Lau Kwai-fong as Queen of Rakshasa
 Tsang Kin-ming as King of India
 Lee Hung-kit as King of Xinluo, Abbot of Pulin Monastery
 Law Kwok-hung as King of Gaochang
 So Yan-tze as Queen of Gaochang
 Chan On-ying as Witty Bug
 Felix Lok as Elder Jinchi
 Yim Man-hin
 Candy Chiu as Porcupine Demon
 Samuel Yau as Golden Haired Hou
 Lee Kwok-lun as Yang Songbai (Erlang Shen's father)
 Emily Kwan as Second Fairy Xueyao Bingqing
 Dickson Li as Dragon King of Qingshui River
 Safina Lam as Little Snow Demon
 Poon Bing-seung as Queen of Zhuzi
 Law Kwan-tso as Qingfeng

External links
  Journey to the West II official page on TVB's website

TVB dramas
Television shows based on Journey to the West
1990s Hong Kong television series
1998 Hong Kong television series debuts
1998 Hong Kong television series endings